The 1957 Czechoslovak presidential election took place on 19 November 1957. It was held due to the death of the incumbent president Antonín Zápotocký. Antonín Novotný was elected the new president.

Background
Antonín Zápotocký died of heart attack in Fall 1957. The Prime Minister Viliam Široký was considered his successor. It was changed when the leader of Soviet Union Nikita Khrushchev suggested Antonín Novotný.

Voting
The election was held on 19 November 1957. Novotný received all 353 votes.

References

Presidential
1957
Single-candidate elections
Elections in Communist Czechoslovakia